Henry Marlar was the member of Parliament for Coventry in 1495. He was also mayor in 1496.

References 

Members of the Parliament of England for Coventry
English MPs 1495
Year of birth missing
Year of death missing
Mayors of Coventry